Derek Cabrera (born 1970) is an American systems theorist and cognitive scientist who applies systems-based concepts to the development of models in human development and learning (education), organizational learning design, management and leadership, organizational change. Models he has formulated include DSRP, MAC (for learning design), VMCL  and NFST (for organizational design). He is also the inventor of MetaMaps and ThinkBlocks.

Biography
Cabrera  received a  Ph.D. from Cornell University with a dissertation entitled Systems Thinking, a synthesis of his research in complexity science and cognition. Cabrera focused his work on the importance of the intersection of ontology and epistemology in understanding human thought and our interactions with the world around us.

Trained as an evolutionary epistemologist,  Cabrera says that knowing how we know things is equally important to what we know, and that humans build knowledge not by merely receiving information but through the interactive, dynamic relationship between information and thinking, which he terms DSRP. His book Thinking at Every  Desk expounds upon these ideas in the field of education and was republished by W. W. Norton & Company. His self-published book Systems Thinking Made Simple explains the  patterns of DSRP and VMCL for a general audience and is used as a textbook at Cornell  University and West Point Military Academy's Systems  Engineering Department.

Cabrera  serves on the faculty at Cornell, where he designed and teaches a graduate-level courses on systems thinking. He received a post-doctoral fellowship at Cornell where he was  awarded a large-scale NSF grant to apply his DSRP theory to the evaluation of large-scale science, technology, engineering, and math (STEM) programs. Cabrera's seminal work in the field of systems evaluation led to the development of "netway" models ("networked pathways"). Cabrera's systems and netway models form the theoretical basis of  Cornell's Office for Research and Evaluation.

He has received several awards and competitive fellowships for his work, including a National Science Foundation IGERT fellowship in nonlinear systems in the Center for Applied  Mathematics and the  Department of Theoretical & Applied Mechanics at Cornell University  and the Association of American Colleges and Universities K.  Patricia Cross Future Leaders Award. He was profiled in a chapter of the book Heroes of Giftedness.

He was a research fellow at the Santa Fe Institute, where he further developed the mathematical basis for DSRP theory, led a team to create multimedia modules about complexity science and Network theory and also developed a new model that applied systems  thinking to the field of evaluation of science programs.

Work
Cabrera pioneered the theory of DSRP, which states that distinctions, systems, relationships, and perspectives are foundational patterns to all human thought (cognition). D, S, R, and P are implicit in all thinking and Cabrera believes that people can improve their thinking skills by learning to explicitly recognize and explicate (e.g., metacognition) the distinctions, systems, relationships, and perspectives underlying anything they wish to understand more deeply or with greater clarity. Through his work at Cornell University and Cabrera Research Lab, Cabrera has applied DSRP to various fields, including: education, evaluation, organizational design, leadership and management, STEM, water science, public policy, leadership and management, psychology, pedagogy and andragogy, and network theory. He frequently speaks at professional conferences and is a leader in efforts to reform the United States' educational system.

In 2008, a special section of the journal Evaluation and Program Planning was dedicated to examining the DSRP theory and method.

Other activities 
Cabrera established several non-profit and cause-based organizations, including leading fundraising for the Aceh Relief Fund after the 2004 Indian Ocean earthquake and tsunami. He co-founded an organization called Children of Rural Africa, which builds schools and community development projects in rural Nigeria.

In 2007, concerned about his experiences teaching ivy league students who were not prepared in terms of thinking skills and abilities, Cabrera and his academic colleague Laura Colosi, also a Ph.D. and Cornell faculty, founded a movement to advance research, innovation, and public understanding of systems thinking and metacognition. Much of their early work focused in the area of education and was based on getting thinking into instruction. They created this movement to ensure that thinking skills were taught to every student nationwide and eventually worldwide. Since its founding, numerous offshoots have been created internationally, in South Korea, Singapore, and Malaysia.

Cabrera works with educators from K-12 to college and even with organizations to infuse thinking skills into existing curricula using the Patterns of Thinking method (also known as DSRP), which Cabrera created. In the DSRP method, students are encouraged to explore any given concept by recognizing and explicating the distinctions, systems, relationships, and perspectives that characterize the concept. They then physically model the concept using a tactile manipulative Cabrera invented called ThinkBlocks, or graphically represent the concept in terms of DSRP using DSRP diagrams.

In July 2014, Cabrera gave the plenary address for the 58th Meeting of the International Society for the Systems Sciences at the School of Business at George Washington University, Washington DC. In July 2014, Cabrera gave the keynote address, with Sir Ken Robinson, at the E3 Conference honoring Cabrera's work in education.

See also

 Boundary critique
 Critical systems thinking
 Double-loop learning 
 Function model
 Higher order thinking
 Metamodeling
 Model-dependent realism
 Systems theory
 
 View model
 World Hypotheses

Books
Cabrera, D. and Cabrera, L. (2015) Systems Thinking Made Simple: New Hope for Solving Wicked Problems. Ithaca, NY: Odyssean Press. 
Cabrera, D. and Colosi, L. (2012) Thinking at Every Desk: Four Simple Skills to Transform Your Classroom. New York, NY: W.W. Norton. 
 Cabrera, D. (2009) Systems Thinking: Four Universal Patterns of Thinking. VDM Verlag. 
 Cabrera, D. (2001) Remedial Genius: Thinking and Learning Using the Patterns of Knowledge. Loveland, CO: Project N Press.

References

External links
 Website for Cabrera Research Lab
 Favorable review of Cabrera's contributions to systems thinking

Living people
American cognitive scientists
American systems scientists
Cornell University alumni
1970 births
Scientists from Ithaca, New York
Place of birth missing (living people)
Santa Fe Institute people